Eresina bilinea is a butterfly in the family Lycaenidae. It is found in north-western Tanzania, western Kenya, Uganda, the north-eastern part of the Democratic Republic of the Congo and Zambia. Its habitat consists of dense, primary forests.

References

Butterflies described in 1935
Poritiinae